The Argiles Ostréennes (French for: "clay with fossil oysters") is a geological formation in northern central France whose strata date back to the Early Cretaceous. Dinosaur remains are among the fossils that have been recovered from the formation.

Vertebrate paleofauna
 Iguanodontia indet

See also

 List of dinosaur-bearing rock formations

References

Lower Cretaceous Series of Europe
Barremian Stage